Higher-Order and Symbolic Computation (formerly LISP and Symbolic Computation; print: ,) was a computer science journal published by Springer Science+Business Media. It focuses on programming concepts and abstractions and programming language theory.  The final issue appeared in 2013.

Editors 
Former editors-in-chief of the journal have been:
 Richard P. Gabriel, Sun Microsystems, Inc., USA (1988 – 1991)
 Guy L. Steele Jr., Sun Microsystems, Inc., USA (1988 – 1991)
 Robert R. Kessler, University of Utah, USA (1991 – 1998)

The last editors-in-chief were  Olivier Danvy (Aarhus University) and Carolyn Talcott (SRI International).

Abstracting and indexing 
The journal is abstracted and indexed in Academic OneFile, ACM Computing Reviews, ACM Digital Library, Computer Abstracts International Database, Computer Science Index, Current Abstracts, EBSCO, EI-Compendex, INSPEC, io-port.net, PASCAL, Scopus, Summon by Serial Solutions, VINITI Database RAS, and Zentralblatt MATH.

See also 
 Journal of Functional Programming
 Journal of Functional and Logic Programming
 Journal of Symbolic Computation

External links 
 
 Journal page at Aarhus University
 Online access
 Higher-Order and Symbolic Computation at DBLP
 The Collection of Computer Science Bibliographies

Computer science journals
Springer Science+Business Media academic journals